The following highways are numbered 868:

United States